Channel 63 refers to several television stations:

United States
The following television stations, which are no longer licensed, formerly broadcast on analog channel 63 in the United States:
 W63DB in Williston, Florida
WMOR-LP in St. Petersburg, Florida
WVRN-TV in Richmond, Virginia

See also
 Channel 63 virtual TV stations in the United States

63